Hsu Feng (born 17 December 1950) is a Taiwanese-born actress and film producer. In the 1970s she was one of the leading actresses of the cinemas of Hong Kong and Taiwan, particularly known for her roles in wuxia films and her work with director King Hu. In 1981 she retired from her career as an actress, but a few years later she returned to the film industry as a producer and went on to produce several award-winning movies. Among them was Chen Kaige's Farewell My Concubine, which won the Palme d'Or (1993) and the BAFTA Award for Best Film not in the English Language (1994) and was nominated for an Academy Award and a César for best foreign film as well.

Early life
Feng was born in Taiwan. Her father was originally from Fujian and her mother from Manchuria. Her father died when she was 6 and her mother remarried. Feng later became the oldest sister of three half siblings. She got her start in film as a means of financially supporting her poor family. Feng answered a casting ad at age 15, which led to a minor role in King Hu's film Dragon Gate Inn (1967). In part, the role led to a six-year contract with the Union Film Company, and away from factory work.

Career

Acting 
About two years later after her small role in Dragon Gate Inn at the age of 19 she got a leading part in King Hu's classic martial arts epos A Touch of Zen (1971). She played the daughter of general Yang, who had to flee the capital after her father was murdered by assassins of the imperial eunuch Wei. Her performance was later described by the film critic Richard Corliss (Time) as the screen's gravest, most ravishing woman warrior. A Touch of Zen later also changed Hsu's outlook on films. Originally she just viewed them simply as a commercial product and means to earn living, but after traveling with King Hu to the Cannes Festival to represent A Touch of Zen, she started to regard films as an art form as well. While A Touch of Zen (1971) was still in post production, Hsu starred in another film called Ten Days in Dragon City (1969) for which she received the Golden Horse Award for Best New Performer She continued to collaborate with King Hu in a string of films. In The Fate of Lee Khan (1973), The Valiant Ones (1975) and Raining in the Mountain (1979) she was portraying martial artists again and for her role in the ghost story Legend of the Mountain (1979) she received a nomination for the Golden Horse Award for Best Actress.

She won the Golden Horse Award as best actress twice for her performances in Assassin (1976) and The Pioneers (1980).

Producing 
After resigning from her career as an actress in 1981 and a hiatus from the film industry in general, Hsu embarked on a career as producer. She set up her own production company Tomson Films in 1983 and specialized primarily on the production of artistic films. Among others she produced Red Dust (1990), Five Girls and a Rope (1992), Farewell, My Concubine (1993), Red Firecracker, Green Firecracker (1994) and Temptress Moon (1996). For Red Dust she received the Golden Horse Award for the best film. Farewell, My Concubine and Temptress Moon were both directed by Chen Kaige and became international successes. In particular the former received several international awards among them the Palme d'Or (1993), the Golden Globe (1993) and BAFTA (1994) Awards for best foreign film.

Other work 
Hsu served as a member of the jury at the 44th Berlin International Film Festival in 1994 and at the 61st Venice International Film Festival in 2004. 2017 she was awarded a Golden Horse lifetime award for her contributions to Taiwanese cinema.

In Shanghai she oversaw the construction of the Tomson Shanghai International Club luxury complex. After the death of her husband in 2004 she took over the management of his business ventures.

Personal life
In 1976, Hsu married Chinese businessman Tong Cun-lin, with whom she has two sons. At the request of her husband she withdrew from acting in the early 1980s and started to work for her husband's business venture.

Filmography

Actress

 1967: Dragon Gate Inn
 1969: City Called Dragon / Ten Days in Dragon City
 1971:	The Invincible Sword
 1971: A Touch of Zen
 1973:	White Butterfly Killer
 1973:	Win Them All
 1973:	End of the Black
 1973: The Fate of Lee Khan
 1973:	My Wife, My Love And My Maid
 1974:	First Come, First Love
 1974:	The Looks of Hong Kong
 1974: Dragon Fury
 1974: Chase Step by Step
 1974: Sex, Love and Hate
 1974: Everlasting Glory
 1975:	Chinese Amazons
 1975: Dragon Gate
 1975: Great Hunter
 1975: Shaolin Disciples
 1975: Eight Hundred Heroes
 1975:	The Valiant Ones
 1976:	A Saturday Date
 1976:	Assassin
 1976:	Seven Spirit Pagoda
 1976: Love in the Twilight Zone
 1976: A Residence in the Mountains
 1977:	Pai Yu-Ching
 1977:	The Chivalry, the Gunman and Killer
 1977: The Greatest Plot
 1977:	The Face Behind The Mask
 1977: Woman of the Hour
 1977:	Deadly Silver Spear
 1977: To Kill with Intrigue
 1977: Shaolin Kung Fu Mystagogue
 1979: The Battle of Ku-ning-tou
 1979: Raining in the Mountain
 1979:	Legend of the Mountain
 1980: Mr. Kwong Tung and the Robber
 1980:	Magnificent 72
 1980: The Lost Kung Fu Secrets
 1980: The Revenger
 1980:	Eight Escorts
 1980:	The Pioneers
 1981: The Last Duel

Producer

 1976: A Residence in the Mountains
 1985: Funny Face
 1985: The Young and Old Wanderers
 1986: Young Dragons - Kung Fu Kids
 1986:	The Woman of Wrath
 1986: Young Dragons - Kung Fu Kids II
 1986: Spring Outside of the Fence)
 1987: The Game They Called Sex
 1987: Young Dragons - Kung Fu Kids III
 1988: Kung Fu Kids Part V: The Adventure of Kung Fu Kids
 1988: My Dream Is Yours
 1989: Kung Fu Kids Part VI: Enter the Young Dragon
 1990: Red Dust
 1992: Five Girls and a Rope
 1992: Let Me Speak Up
 1993: Farewell My Concubine
 1996: Temptress Moon
 2004: Shanghai Story

References

Further reading
 Yingjin Zhang, Zhiwei Xiao: Encyclopedia of Chinese Film. Taylor & Francis, 1998, p. 191 
 Lily Xiao Hong Lee, Clara Wing-chung Ho: Biographical Dictionary of Chinese Women, Volume 2. M. E. Sharpe 2003, pp. 231–233
 Joan Dupont: "For Hsu Feng, Films of Her Homeland Are a Passion: Tribute to a Chinese Producer". The New York Times, 1998-5-23
 "Hsu Feng, Swordwoman Forever"—Hsu Feng's biography at Tomson Films (retrieved 2009-9-27)
 Lily Tung: "Waiting for the Ice to Melt". AsiaWeek, CNN, 1998-4-9

External links
 
 Hsu Feng at the Hong Kong Movie Database
 XU Feng - Hsu Feng at asiepassion.com 

1951 births
Living people
Taiwanese film producers
Taiwanese film actresses
20th-century Taiwanese actresses
Actresses from Taipei
Businesspeople from Taipei
Filmmakers who won the Best Foreign Language Film BAFTA Award